Jaime Luis Estévez Valencia (born 27 September 1946) is a Chilean politician who served as President of the Chamber of Deputies, ministry of State and president of the football branch of the Club Deportivo Universidad Católica (Católica), institution linked with the same university.

In 2011, he became an investor of Católica.

References

External links
 BCN Profile

1946 births
Living people
20th-century Chilean economists
People from Santiago
University of Chile alumni
Christian Democratic Party (Chile) politicians
Popular Unitary Action Movement politicians
Party for Democracy (Chile) politicians
Socialist Party of Chile politicians
Presidents of the Chamber of Deputies of Chile
Club Deportivo Universidad Católica chairmen and investors
21st-century Chilean economists